Teen Scene is an online magazine for teenagers and young adults by teenagers and young adults. The magazine publishes between a new themed issue per month with new content published daily. TeenScene′s content focuses primarily on five different channels: real life, beauty, music, movies and TV. Teen Scene and its parent company, Kennedy Omnimedia, are based in Northwest Indiana outside of Chicago.

The beginning
In May 2000 at the young age of 13 Chad M. Kennedy started Teen Scene. His first interview was with the boyband 'N Sync on March 3, 2000, to promote their album No Strings Attached. The first issue of Teen Scene was published on May 10, 2000, and featured 'N Sync, Backstreet Boys and Britney Spears on the front page. The website attracted an impressive 200,000 hits the first week.

Present
Teen Scene has nearly 30 volunteer writers and editors. Currently, the magazine attracts around 150,000 readers per month. Teen Scene has two sister sites: Insider Gossip, a Hollywood gossip blog, and By the Book Reviews, a book review site for teens and young adults.

Media coverage
Teen Scene has been featured in newspapers, magazines, websites, radio, television shows, and movies. The magazine was first mentioned in the hit Disney movie The Princess Diaries, starring Julie Andrews and Anne Hathaway. It was also a regular feature on the Nickelodeon television show The Fairly OddParents and NBC's sitcom American Dreams. Other coverage has included MSN Money, Entrepreneur.com, Amazing Kids, Orlando Sentinel and  YPulse.com, KISS-fm 103.5 Chicago, among others.

See also
List of teen magazines

External links
 Teen Scene website

Teen magazines
Magazines established in 2000
Online magazines published in the United States
Magazines published in Chicago